Dimitris Beis (1928 – 25 October 2012) was a Greek politician. He was Mayor of Athens from 1979 to 1986. He also served as a Member of Parliament.

References

1928 births
2012 deaths
Mayors of Athens
PASOK politicians
Greek MPs 1989 (June–November)
Greek MPs 1989–1990
Greek MPs 1990–1993
Greek MPs 1993–1996
People from Edessa, Greece